Éric Meloche (born May 1, 1976) is a Canadian former professional ice hockey right winger who played in the National Hockey League (NHL) for the Pittsburgh Penguins and Philadelphia Flyers. He is the son of former player Gilles Meloche.

Playing career
Meloche began his career by playing junior hockey with the Cornwall Colts of the OCJHL. After playing there for two seasons, he was selected by the Pittsburgh Penguins in the seventh round, 186th overall, of the 1996 NHL Entry Draft.

From there he played collegiate hockey with the Ohio State Buckeyes in the CCHA. After graduating in 2000, he played his first full season of professional hockey for the Wilkes-Barre/Scranton Penguins, the AHL affiliate of the Pittsburgh Penguins. Until 2004 he would split his seasons between the two teams, but the Penguins decided to let him become an unrestricted free agent once his contract ran out.

On July 14, 2004, he signed with the Philadelphia Flyers, who assigned him to the Philadelphia Phantoms of the AHL, where he spent the whole season due to the lockout. Despite being a part of the Calder Cup winning team, Meloche was never called up to the NHL until he was traded to the Chicago Blackhawks along with Patrick Sharp for Matt Ellison and a draft pick on December 5, 2005. He was immediately assigned to the Norfolk Admirals and finished the season there.

On August 2, 2006, the Philadelphia Flyers traded European prospect Václav Pletka to the Chicago Blackhawks in order to regain the winger. After the 2006–07 season, Meloche signed with the Straubing Tigers of the German Deutsche Eishockey Liga (DEL) where he spent the next four seasons.

Awards
 2004–05: Calder Cup (Philadelphia Phantoms)

Career statistics

External links
 

1976 births
Living people
Canadian ice hockey right wingers
Ice hockey people from Montreal
Norfolk Admirals players
Ohio State Buckeyes men's ice hockey players
Philadelphia Flyers players
Philadelphia Phantoms players
Pittsburgh Penguins draft picks
Pittsburgh Penguins players
Straubing Tigers players
Wilkes-Barre/Scranton Penguins players
Canadian expatriate ice hockey players in Germany